Olivet University is headquartered in San Francisco, California, United States.

Olivet University may also refer to:

 Olivet Nazarene University, Bourbonnais, Illinois, United States

See also
 Olivet College